The 2022 season was the 15th season for the IPL cricket franchise Royal Challengers Bangalore based in Bangalore, Karnataka , India. They were one of the ten teams to compete in the 2022 Indian Premier League. The team is captained by Faf Du Plessis, and coached by Sanjay Bangar.

Background
The side retained three players ahead of the 2022 mega-auction.

Retained Virat Kohli, Glenn Maxwell, Mohammad Siraj.
Released Sachin Baby, Rajat Patidar, Tim David, Suyash Prabhudessai, Devdutt Padikkal, Dan Christian, Pavan Deshpande, Daniel Sams, Shahbaz Ahmed, Washington Sundar, AB de Villiers (Retired), K. S. Bharat, Mohammed Azharuddeen, Josh Philippe, Finn Allen, Yuzvendra Chahal, Adam Zampa, Harshal Patel, Kane Richardson, Scott Kuggeleijn, Dushmantha Chameera, Navdeep Saini, Kyle Jamieson, Akash Deep, George Garton.
Acquired during the auction Shahbaz Ahmed, Wanindu Hasaranga, Harshal Patel, Finn Allen, Faf du Plessis, Mahipal Lomror, David Willey, Sherfane Rutherford, Suyash Prabhudessai, Aneeshwar Gautam, Dinesh Karthik, Anuj Rawat, Siddarth Kaul, Akash Deep, Luvnith Sisodia, Karn Sharma, Josh Hazlewood, Jason Behrendorff, Chama Milind.

Unbox Event
On 30 March RCB organized an event on Museum Road, Bengaluru, where they released their look of new jersey and  announced Faf du Plessis as their new captain for the season.

Squad 
 Players with international caps are listed in bold
Squad strength: 24 (17 - Indian, 7 - overseas)

Administration and support staff

Kit manufacturers and sponsors

|

Teams and standings

Points table

Group stages

Matches

Playoffs

Preliminary

Eliminator

Qualifier 2

Statistics

Most runs

References

External links 
Official Website
 

2022 Indian Premier League
Royal Challengers Bangalore seasons